Punta Brava Golf Club is a private golf & surf club currently under development in Ensenada, Baja California, Mexico at the tip of the Punta Banda Peninsula. The site is framed by the Pacific Ocean on one side and the Bay of Todos Santos on the other. In 2011, the course was announced to be designed by Tiger Woods. CNN feature in 2011 highlighted delays in the project.  Golf course architect Tom Doak announced he will lead the project design on The Fried Egg podcast in 2022.

History
In 2006, former Charles Schwab executive, Brian Tucker, set out to develop a world-class golf course after discovering a plot of land at the tip of the Punta Banda peninsula, which extends 7 miles into the Pacific Ocean. 

The project was officially announced at a press conference at the Hotel Bel Air in Los Angeles in October 2008 with capital support from Red McCombs

References

External links
Official site

Golf clubs and courses in Mexico
Ensenada, Baja California
Tiger Woods
Sports venues in Baja California